Trewavasia carinata is an extinct pycnodontid fish in the family Coccodontidae that lived during the lower Cenomanian of what is now Lebanon.  It had a large, forward-pointing horn-like spine between its eyes, and a massive stump-like spine emanating from the back of its head.  T. carinata is closely related the genera Corusichthys and Hensodon, as well as Coccodus.

References

Cretaceous bony fish
Pycnodontiformes genera
Late Cretaceous fish of Asia